USS Reprisal (CV-35) was a planned member of the s of World War II. Due to hostilities ending in the Pacific Theater, marking the end of World War II, and a number of other veteran Essex-class carriers being available, her construction was cancelled on August 12, 1945 when she was about 52.3% completed. She was launched later that year to clear the slipway and perform bomb damage assessment. Plans were drawn up to complete her as an attack carrier, but the plan was ultimately dropped and she was sold to Boston Metals Co., Baltimore, Maryland for scrap in 1949.

References

External links

Aircraft carriers of the United States Navy
Cancelled ships of the United States Navy
Essex-class aircraft carriers
1945 ships